Effa Motors is an Uruguayan automobile and commercial vehicle manufacturer with headquarters in San José de Mayo in southern Uruguay. The company was founded by Eduardo Effa in 2006 for the construction of the vehicles imported as CKD kits used. Effa is located in the same workshop as the defunct automaker Dolce Vitta, whose World Manufacturer Codes of 9UP, 9UR and 9US are used for beginning of Effa's vehicle identification numbers. The company is a subsidiary of the Aler Group.

Effa maintains partnerships with Chinese automakers Changhe, Hafei, Huanghai (a brand of Liaoning Shuguang), JinBei (JinBei trucks known as JBC), Jiangling Motors (JMC), Lifan and Sinotruk.

Company history
The first model offered by Effa was the subcompact Effa Ideal  When exported to Brazil the vehicle was badge engineered as the Effa M100. The Effa Aojun was the first SUV/Pickup introduced in 2008. The Aojun has since been enclosed as a minivan. The Coach or the Furgón, is a flatbed pick-up truck with a single or double cab. ICalled the Effa Picape in Brazil. The Furgão, the van, the Longa and Cabine Dupla are available in Brazil. For bulky objects there is the Baú.

A second plant in Manaus started operating in 2010. Here the JMC Boarding and Effa Picape Baú are built. In addition, the models are in order Lifan 320, Lifan 520, Lifan 620, Lifan Foison and the Lifan X60 built.

In Uruguay, the second generation of the Ideal was launched. Also new is the Effa JinBei, a sister model of the Isuzu Rodeo, which was never available in Uruguay itself. Slightly larger is the Effa Plutus, which will be built for the American market in a long version.

The third manufacturer began working in Barueri in the summer of 2012, mainly producing medium and heavy-duty trucks. Additionally the Effa Picape, Effa Van, JMC N350 and S350 JMC are built or modified here.

Current models

Effa
Source:

Effa Aojun (2008–present)
Effa Start Van (2012–present)

Former model

Effa
Source:

Effa-JBC
Effa-JBC 3.2 Turbo Intercooler (SY1040DVA, 2012–present)

Effa-JMC
Source:

 Effa-JMC 2.8 Turbo Intercooler N601 (2012–present, 3-Tonner)
 Effa-JMC 2.8 Turbo Intercooler N900 (2012–present, 4-Tonner)
 JMC N350 (2012–present)

Current Effa-Lifan
Source:

Former Effa-Lifan
Source:

Effa-Sinotruk
Source:
 Sinotruk Howa 6x2 tractor
 Sinotruk Howa 6x2 Cargo

See also
Bognor
Sevel#Sevel Uruguay S.A.

References

External links 
 Grupo Aler official site in Uruguay (Spanish)
 Effa official site in Brazil (Portuguese)

Truck manufacturers of Uruguay
Car manufacturers of Uruguay
Uruguayan brands